James Carson (July 30, 1901 – May 13, 1964) was an American water polo player. He competed in the men's tournament at the 1920 Summer Olympics.

References

External links
 

1901 births
1964 deaths
American male water polo players
Olympic water polo players of the United States
Water polo players at the 1920 Summer Olympics
Sportspeople from San Francisco